Shingo Kunieda was the defending champion, but chose not to participate.

Gustavo Fernández won the title, defeating Joachim Gérard in the final, 6–0, 3–6, 6–1.

Seeds

Draw

References
 Draw

2015 ABN AMRO World Tennis Tournament